Charles Coltman Coltman-Rogers  (born Charles Coltman Rogers; 1854 – 19 May 1929), was a British agriculturalist and Liberal Party politician.  

Educated at Eton and Brasenose College, Oxford, he was prominent in local government and agricultural policy in Radnorshire and Shropshire from the 1870s until his death. He sat briefly in the House of Commons from 1884 to 1885 as the Member of Parliament (MP) for Radnor (UK Boroughs). In 1922 he became Lord Lieutenant of Radnorshire, a position he held until his death.

References 

1854 births
1929 deaths
People educated at Eton College
Liberal Party (UK) MPs for Welsh constituencies
UK MPs 1880–1885
Alumni of Brasenose College, Oxford
Deputy Lieutenants of Radnorshire
High Sheriffs of Radnorshire
Lord-Lieutenants of Radnorshire
Councillors in Wales
British agriculturalists